John Stewart Gathorne-Hardy, 2nd Earl of Cranbrook (22 March 1839 – 13 July 1911), known as Lord Medway from 1892 to 1906, was a British peer and Conservative Member of Parliament. 

Born John Stewart Hardy, Lord Cranbrook was the eldest son of the Conservative politician Gathorne Gathorne-Hardy, 1st Earl of Cranbrook, and Jane Stewart Orr. He assumed the additional surname of Gathorne by Royal licence in 1878 and when his father was elevated to the peerage as Earl of Cranbrook in 1892, he gained the courtesy title of Lord Medway. Cranbrook was elected to the House of Commons for Rye in 1868, a seat he held until 1880, and later represented Mid Kent from 1884 to 1885 and Medway from 1885 to 1892. In 1906, he succeeded his father as second Earl of Cranbrook and took his seat in the House of Lords.

In 1867 at Plaxtol, Kent, Lord Cranbrook married Cicely Marguerite Wilhelmina Ridgway, daughter of Joseph Ridgway and Selina Harriet Doyle (died 1861, Egypt), daughter of Sir Francis Hastings Doyle, 1st Baronet. Their eldest son Gathorne succeeded as the 3rd Earl of Cranbrook. Their younger son, Hon. Sir John Francis Gathorne-Hardy, was a general in the army. Their daughter, Lady Dorothy Milner Gathorne-Hardy, married Rupert D'Oyly Carte, founder of the Savoy Hotel.

Lord Cranbrook died in July 1911, aged 72, and was succeeded by his eldest son, Gathorne Gathorne-Hardy, 3rd Earl of Cranbrook. Lady Cranbrook died in 1931.

Notes

Bibliography
 Kidd, Charles, Williamson, David (editors). Debrett's Peerage and Baronetage (106th edition) (New York: St Martin's Press 1990)
 Williamson, D (ed.) Debrett's Peerage and Baronetage (107th edition) (London 2002)

External links 
 
 
 

Cranbrook, John Stewart Gathorne-Hardy, 2nd Earl
Cranbrook, John Stewart Gathorne-Hardy, 2nd Earl
Cranbrook, John Stewart Gathorne-Hardy, 2nd Earl
Conservative Party (UK) MPs for English constituencies
UK MPs 1868–1874
UK MPs 1874–1880
UK MPs 1880–1885
UK MPs 1885–1886
UK MPs 1886–1892
Cranbrook, John Stewart Gathorne-Hardy, 2nd Earl
Rifle Brigade officers
Gathorne-Hardy family